Bactrospora is a genus of lichen-forming fungi of uncertain familial placement in the order Arthoniales. It was circumscribed by Abramo Bartolommeo Massalongo in 1852.

Species
Bactrospora angularis 
Bactrospora arthonioides 
Bactrospora brevispora 
Bactrospora carolinensis 
Bactrospora cascadensis 
Bactrospora corticola 
Bactrospora dryina 
Bactrospora flavopruinosa 
Bactrospora granularis 
Bactrospora homalotropa 
Bactrospora inspersa 
Bactrospora lamprospora 
Bactrospora lecanorina 
Bactrospora littoralis 
Bactrospora medians 
Bactrospora metabola 
Bactrospora micareoides 
Bactrospora ochracea 
Bactrospora paludicola 
Bactrospora perspiralis 
Bactrospora subdryina 
Bactrospora thyrsodes

References

Arthoniomycetes
Ascomycota genera
Lichen genera
Taxa described in 1852
Taxa named by Abramo Bartolommeo Massalongo